Canet or Cannet may refer to:

Places:

Several communes in France:
 Canet, Aude, in the Aude département
 Canet, Hérault, in the Hérault département
 Canet-de-Salars, in the Aveyron département
 Canet-en-Roussillon, in the Pyrénées-Orientales département
 Cannet, in the Gers département
 Le Cannet, in the Alpes-Maritimes département
 Le Cannet-des-Maures, in the Var département

Several towns in Spain:

 Canet d'Adri, in the province of Girona
 Canet d'en Berenguer, in the province of Valencia
 Canet de Mar, in the province of Barcelona
 Canet lo Roig, in the province of Castellón
People:

 Guillaume Canet (born 1973), French actor and film director
 Albert Canet (1878 – 1930), French tennis player

Other:
CAnet, a high-speed research network in Canada
Château Pontet-Canet, Bordeaux wine estate, originally named Canet
Canet guns, weapons system developed by Gustave Canet